Aleksandr Ivanovich Medvedkin (24 February 1900 – 20 February 1989) was a Soviet Russian film director, best known for his 1935 film Happiness. His life and art are the subject of Chris Marker's documentary films, The Train Rolls On (1971) and The Last Bolshevik (1992). 

He travelled around Russia in his Kinopoezd, a Cinetrain, in which he carried film equipment and shot movies in Kolkhozy, which he would then screen there.

Selected filmography
 Happiness (1935)
 The Miracle Worker (1936)
 The New Moscow (1938)
 Blossoming Youth (1939)
 The Liberated Earth (1946)

References

External links

The Last Bolshevik by Chris Marker  by Chris Marker

1900 births
1989 deaths
Soviet film directors
Academic staff of the Gerasimov Institute of Cinematography
People's Artists of the USSR
Soviet screenwriters
Recipients of the Order of Lenin

Soviet documentary film directors
Recipients of the USSR State Prize